Gaétan Barrette (born July 5, 1956) is a Canadian politician in Quebec, who was elected to the National Assembly of Quebec in the 2014 election. He represented the electoral district of La Pinière as a member of the Quebec Liberal Party until retiring from politics at the 2022 Quebec general election.

Prior to his election to the legislature, he was a radiologist at Montreal's Hôpital Maisonneuve-Rosemont. He ran in the 2012 election as a candidate of the Coalition Avenir Québec in Terrebonne, but ran as a Liberal in 2014. He was named Minister of Health and Social Services on April 24, 2014. His tenure as heath minister was considered so controversial that leader Philippe Couillard instead tapped Getrude Bourdon, who resigned from her role as the CEO of the Laval University hospital to run as a candidate in the riding of Jean-Lesage if the party won the 2018 election.

Indigenous Health
As Health Minister of Quebec, in 2018 Dr. Barrette opposed the families and physicians who were fighting against Quebec's practise of not allowing Indigenous families to accompany their critically ill children on flight transportation for urgent care. He was recorded making the comment "I guarantee you that there will be at least one instance in the next six months where someone will not be allowed to get on the plane. Why? Because no one — agitated, drugged, under whatever influence — would get on the plane at any cost. That will not happen. And that happens all the time." Indigenous leaders called for his immediate resignation, and did not accept his delayed, eventual apology. The ministry did later change regulations to allow for caregivers or parents to accompany their ill children on urgent medical air transfers, after years of discussions.

Electoral record

* Result compared to Action démocratique

References

External links 

 National Assembly profile

Quebec Liberal Party MNAs
Living people
French Quebecers
Canadian radiologists
1956 births
Members of the Executive Council of Quebec
People from Brossard
People from La Tuque, Quebec
Université de Montréal alumni
University of San Diego alumni
Grenoble Alpes University alumni
21st-century Canadian politicians
Health ministers of Quebec